Liliana Venâncio (born 19 September 1995) is an Angolan handball player for club Primeiro de Agosto and the Angolan national team.

She competed at the 2015 World Women's Handball Championship in Denmark and at the 2016 Summer Olympics.

Achievements 
Carpathian Trophy:
Winner: 2019

References

External links

1995 births
Living people
Angolan female handball players
Olympic handball players of Angola
Handball players at the 2016 Summer Olympics
Handball players from Luanda
Handball players at the 2020 Summer Olympics